Frostbite is a game engine developed by DICE, designed for cross-platform use on Microsoft Windows, seventh generation game consoles PlayStation 3 and Xbox 360, eighth generation game consoles PlayStation 4, Xbox One and Nintendo Switch and ninth generation game consoles PlayStation 5 and Xbox Series X/S, in addition to usage in the cloud streaming service Google Stadia.

The game engine was originally employed in the Battlefield video game series, but would later be expanded to other first-person shooter video games and a variety of other genres. To date, Frostbite has been exclusive to video games published by Electronic Arts.

History

Frostbite 1 and 1.5 

The first iteration of the Frostbite game engine made its debut in the 2008 video game, Battlefield: Bad Company. The engine was developed with an HDR Audio and Destruction 1.0. HDR Audio allowed differing sound levels to be perceived by the player whilst Destruction 1.0 allowed players to destroy the environment. A newer version of Frostbite would later be employed in Battlefield 1943 (2009) and Battlefield: Bad Company 2 (2010), which would come to be known as Frostbite 1.5. In the upgraded game engine, it was now possible for players to cause enough destruction to entirely demolish structures. This version was also employed in the multiplayer aspect of Medal of Honor (2010), becoming the first video game outside of the Battlefield series to run on Frostbite.

Frostbite 2 

On 25 October 2011, Frostbite 2 made its debut in Battlefield 3. Frostbite 2 has upgrades such as deferred rendering and real-time radiosity   and Destruction 3.0, which made falling debris potentially lethal to the player. Further changes to the engine included the addition of suppressive fire and disabling vehicles before destroying them. For the first time in a game that was not a shooter nor developed by DICE, Frostbite was brought to the Need for Speed series with 2011's Need for Speed: The Run, which was released on 15 November. It took a year for EA Black Box, the developer of Need for Speed: The Run, to re-purpose the game engine for driving instead of shooting. On 21 May 2012, DICE rendering architect Johan Andersson said that future personal computer video games running on Frostbite would have to be played on 64-bit operating systems. On 23 October, Medal of Honor: Warfighter became the first game of its series to feature Frostbite in both single and multiplayer. On 26 March 2013, Army of Two: The Devil's Cartel became the first third-person shooter and last video game to employ Frostbite 2.

Frostbite 3 
In March 2013, Battlefield executive producer Patrick Bach announced that Frostbite 3 would not support the Wii U, saying that "the Wii U is not a part of our focus right now." The third generation of Frostbite made its debut in Battlefield 4 on 29 October. In the updated engine, the environments became much more dynamic upon the actions of the players and Destruction 4.0, which was known as Levolution in Battlefield 4. On one map of Battlefield 4, it was possible for players to destroy a dam, causing the entire map to be flooded by water. On 13 November in San Jose, DICE's Frostbite engine technical director Johan Andersson announced that future Frostbite games and an updated version of Battlefield 4 would be powered by Mantle, a low-overhead rendering API co-developed by AMD and DICE. However, due to lack of interest and support, Mantle was phased out, with 2015's Battlefield Hardline being the last game to implement it. On 15 November, Need for Speed Rivals became the second game of its series to use the game engine and the first since the upgrade to Frostbite 3.

First released on 25 February 2014, Plants vs. Zombies: Garden Warfare became the first game of its series to run on Frostbite. On 18 November, the game engine made its debut in the action role-playing genre of video games with Dragon Age: Inquisition. On 17 March 2015, Battlefield Hardline became the second game of its series to run on Frostbite 3. In November, Need for Speed and Star Wars Battlefront were both released under Frostbite, the 2016 Rogue One X-Wing VR Mission expansion for the latter game exclusive to the PlayStation VR and being the first VR title to use the engine. On 23 February 2016, Plants vs. Zombies: Garden Warfare 2 was released on the game engine. On 7 June, Mirror's Edge Catalyst became the first action-adventure game to run on Frostbite. On 21 October, Battlefield 1 became the third title of its series to be released under the third generation of the game engine. 

On 21 March 2017, Mass Effect: Andromeda was released on Frostbite. On 10 November, Need for Speed Payback was released, running on the game engine; a week later on November 17, Star Wars Battlefront II was the last game of 2017 to be released on Frostbite. 2018's Battlefield V runs on the Frostbite 3 engine. In 2019, Anthem, Plants vs. Zombies: Battle for Neighborville, and Need for Speed Heat were all released running Frostbite.

In 2020, Star Wars: Squadrons is the second VR-compatible game to run on Frostbite, the PC version of the game bringing VR support on PC to the engine (following usage on the abovementioned Rogue One X-Wing VR Mission expansion); on Xbox Series X and S, the game received support for high frame rates and 4K, alongside visual improvements. In February 2021, following the announcement of a Nintendo Switch version of Plants vs. Zombies: Battle for Neighborville, Frostbite will run on a Nintendo console for the first time. Prior to the game's production, Switch support was added into the Frostbite engine.

Usage in Battlefield 2042 and next-generation consoles 
Battlefield 2042 was released in November 2021 using a new version of the Frostbite engine. As Battlefield 2042 was initially developed on an older version of Frostbite, the developers had to update the engine in order to run the game. This new version of Frostbite took 18 months of development time. In October 2022, Need for Speed Unbound was announced to be using the Frostbite engine; this marks developer Criterion Games' first game using the engine. The game would be released on 2 December 2022 utilizing the Battlefield 2042 iteration of Frostbite.

In the same month, studio head of Ridgeline Games, Marcus Lehto, confirmed that the next installment of the Battlefield franchise will be developed on an upgraded version of Frostbite.  The 2023 remake of Dead Space also utilizes Frostbite.

EA Sports titles 
 See Games using Frostbite for a full list.
On 14 July 2015, the game engine was introduced to the sports genre of video games, being put to use on Rory McIlroy PGA Tour. On 27 September 2016, the game engine debuted on the FIFA video game series, being employed on FIFA 17. Only the PlayStation 4, Xbox One and PC versions of the game and future installments will run on Frostbite; the PlayStation 3 and Xbox 360 versions, in addition to the Nintendo Switch version, do not use the engine in favor of Ignite, the engine used by the current-generation games until FIFA 17, which also meant the exclusion of The Journey campaign and new features like the UEFA Champions League mode (introduced in FIFA 19) from those editions. These titles are referred to as "Legacy Editions".

Madden NFL 18, the first of its series to be released on Frostbite, was released on 25 August 2017.

The PlayStation 5 and Xbox Series X/S versions of FIFA 21, released in December 2020, feature graphical enhancements to take advantage of the newer hardware. In 2020, FIFA 21 is one of two Frostbite games (the other being Star Wars: Squadrons) to receive major enhancements for the PlayStation 5 and Xbox Series X and S.

The 2021 installment of the NHL series, NHL 22, and future installments afterward, runs on Frostbite (compared to the Ignite engine used in previous installments), bringing it to that series for the first time.

In 2022, Madden NFL 23 was released utilizing Frostbite 3, and introduced a new physics-based interaction system called FieldSense.

Following FIFA 21s successor, FIFA 22, not receiving the PlayStation 5 and Xbox Series-exclusive enhancements on PC versions, 2022's FIFA 23 brings the features to that platform for the first time and upgrades the engine version to the one used in Battlefield 2042. The upcoming title EA Sports PGA Tour is set to use the engine.

Frostbite Labs 
In May 2016, EA announced it had formed Frostbite Labs, a dedicated research division focusing on the development of the Frostbite engine as well as its use in future technological innovations such as VR experiences, neural networks and machine learning. Frostbite Labs is composed of a team of 30–40 developers operating in two offices, one in Stockholm, Sweden and the other in Vancouver, Canada.

Criticism 
Frostbite is notorious for having well-publicized difficulties, including its complexity. This led to numerous reports of development issues surrounding Frostbite titles; a majority of these issues came with the engine's usage at BioWare, which has criticized the engine for its aforemenioned complexity, which made adapting common elements found in role-playing games to the engine rather difficult.

With EA pushing for the usage of Frostbite 3 in many of their developers' titles, refacilitating the engine for BioWare's 2014 title, Dragon Age: Inquisition, proved difficult for the developer; the title's executive producer, Mark Darrah, said about the engine that "...at launch we still didn’t actually have all our tools working. We had our tools working enough." Prior to moving to Frostbite, the Dragon Age series utilized the Eclipse Engine. The move to Frostbite 3 resulted in BioWare cancelling a piece of downloadable content for Dragon Age II; that game received a divided audience reception, with BioWare aiming to improve on the next Dragon Age game. Adding new features to the engine for use in Inquisition proved difficult, as the engine was primarily used in first-person video games. However, issues initially faced by the development team were solved as BioWare and DICE started to cooperate better, and the engine allowed the Inquisition art team to develop extensive worlds in a short time. However, with the release scheduled for late 2014, the team resorted to extensive crunching.

With Visceral Games being tapped to publish the Star Wars title Project Ragtag, the company was occupied with the development of Battlefield Hardline; after the latter game was released, Ragtags development suffered from many setbacks, one of them being the usage of Frostbite and their difficulties adapting it to third-person shooters. By 2017, Ragtag was ultimately cancelled and Visceral shuttered, with resources being shifted over to the then-impending development of DICE's Star Wars Battlefront II.

In 2017, Mass Effect: Andromeda suffered from multiple issues at launch due in part to the complexities of Frostbite and a troubled development. BioWare had previously faced these issues before during the aforementioned development of Dragon Age: Inquisition and would continue to do so during development of Andromeda. In 2019, sources within BioWare claimed that Frostbite's complexity had also contributed to difficulties surrounding Anthems development. Former BioWare general manager Aaryn Flynn acknowledged these issues in an interview in November 2019.

Due to being developed in 15–18 months, developers of Battlefield 2042 from DICE had issues with Frostbite.

In June 2021, tools used in the development of Frostbite, a majority of them regarding development of FIFA 21 including its source code, were leaked; the contents were released on August 2, 2021.

Games using Frostbite

Notes 
 Excludes PlayStation 3, Xbox 360 (up to 2018's FIFA 19) and Nintendo Switch "Legacy" editions.

References

External links 
 Frostbite's Official Homepage
 Frostbite Rendering Architecture
 DICE Publications
 DICE's Official Homepage

2008 software
3D graphics software
Electronic Arts
Game engines that support Vulkan (API)
Global illumination software
Proprietary software
Video game engines